John Gilligan is an Irish sportsperson.  He plays hurling & Gaelic football with the Westmeath senior inter-county hurling & football teams. He is only one of a handful of dual stars in the country. On 22 May 2011, he made his championship debut against Carlow in the 2011 All-Ireland Senior Hurling Championship, coming on as a substitute in a 4-10 to 1-14 win. He is expected to make his Senior football championship debut this summer for Westmeath. John also has an international rules cap for Ireland vs Scotland from 2011.

References

Living people
Westmeath inter-county hurlers
Year of birth missing (living people)
Ballymore hurlers